Miguel Román, serves as Chief Climate Scientist and Technical Fellow at Leidos. A leading expert in the fields of satellite remote sensing, climate change, disaster risk reduction, and sustainability, Román has championed translational research and data-intensive approaches to assess and address climate-related risks. His work is internationally recognized for shedding light on the disproportionate hardships experienced by socially-vulnerable and underserved communities following major disasters.

In 2022, Román was named the team leader of the Moderate Resolution Imaging Spectroradiometer (MODIS) science team for NASA's Terra and Aqua missions. Román also serves as the land discipline leader for the Suomi-NPP and NOAA-20 Visible Infrared Imaging Radiometer Suite (VIIRS) science team, a worldwide group of investigators and technical staff in charge of one of the largest and most comprehensive polar-orbiting satellite systems operated by NASA and NOAA to monitor our planet's vital signs.

In 2016, Dr. Román was recognized by President Barack Obama with the Presidential Early Career Award for Scientists and Engineers (PECASE), the highest honor bestowed by the United States government on scientists and engineers beginning their independent careers.  He is also a 2014 Service to America Medal Samuel J. Heyman Service to America Medals finalist, one of the highest honors for federal civil servants.

A native of San Juan, Puerto Rico, Dr. Román holds a bachelor's degree in electrical engineering from the University of Puerto Rico at Mayagüez, a master's degree in systems engineering from Cornell University, and a Ph.D. in geography from Boston University.

Personal life
Román is married to noted astrophysicist and marathon runner Julia Román-Duval; they have three children.

See also

List of Puerto Ricans in the United States Space Program
List of Puerto Rican Scientists and Inventors

References

External links
Miguel Roman. Leidos taps Miguel Román to serve as top climate scientist. Retrieved 2022-10-19.

Cornell University alumni
People from San Juan, Puerto Rico
Puerto Rican scientists
NASA people